The Branford Marsalis Quartet is a jazz band.

Current members
Branford Marsalis – saxophones
Joey Calderazzo - piano (1999–present)
Eric Revis - bass guitar (1997–present)
Justin Faulkner - drums (2009–present)

Past members
Jeff "Tain" Watts - drums (1986–2009)
Kenny Kirkland - piano (1987–1998)
Robert Hurst - bass guitar

Discography
1986 Royal Garden Blues
1987 Renaissance
1988 Random Abstract
1990 Crazy People Music
1991 I Heard You Twice the First Time
1998 Requiem
2000 Contemporary Jazz
2002 Footsteps of Our Fathers
2003 Romare Bearden Revealed
2004 Eternal
2004 Coltrane's A Love Supreme Live
2006 Braggtown
2009 Metamorphosen
2012 Four MFs Playin' Tunes
2016 Upward Spiral 
2019 The Secret Between the Shadow and the Soul

See also
Marsalis Music

External links
Branford Marsalis, official web site

 

American jazz ensembles
Post-bop ensembles
Grammy Award winners
Marsalis family